Ukrupata (Quechua ukru hole, pit, hollow, pata elevated place; above, at the top; edge, bank (of a river), shore, Hispanicized spelling Urcupata) is a mountain in the Andes of Peru, about  high. It is situated in the Lima Region, Huarochirí Province, on the border of the districts of Chicla and Carampoma. Ukrupata lies northwest of Millpu and east of Wamp'ar and the two lakes named Wamp'arqucha and Wachwaqucha.

References

Mountains of Peru
Mountains of Lima Region